In differential geometry, conjugate points or focal points are, roughly, points that can almost be joined by a 1-parameter family of geodesics. For example, on a sphere, the north-pole and south-pole are connected by any meridian. Another viewpoint is that conjugate points tell when the geodesics fail to be length-minimizing. All geodesics are locally length-minimizing, but not globally. For example on a sphere, any geodesic passing through the north-pole can be extended to reach the south-pole, and hence any geodesic segment connecting the poles is not (uniquely) globally length minimizing. This tells us that any pair of antipodal points on the standard 2-sphere are conjugate points.

Definition
Then p and q are conjugate points along  if there exists a non-zero Jacobi field along  that vanishes at p and q.

Recall that any Jacobi field can be written as the derivative of a geodesic variation (see the article on Jacobi fields).  Therefore, if p and q are conjugate along , one can construct a family of geodesics that start at p and almost end at q.  In particular,
if  is the family of geodesics whose derivative in s at  generates the Jacobi field J, then the end point
of the variation, namely , is the point q only up to first order in s.  Therefore, if two points are conjugate, it is not necessary that there exist two distinct geodesics joining them.

Examples
 On the sphere , antipodal points are conjugate.
 On , there are no conjugate points.
 On Riemannian manifolds with non-positive sectional curvature, there are no conjugate points.

See also
 Cut locus
 Jacobi field

References

Riemannian geometry